Geopinus incrassatus is a species of beetle in the family Carabidae, the only species in the genus Geopinus.

Feeding habits
They are sometimes considered a minor pest when they eat the seedlings in seed beds in agricultural systems, especially wheat, cabbage, corn, flax and oats.

Conservation
The species is listed as a special concern in Connecticut.

References

Harpalinae